Maud K. Lavin (born 10 November 1954) is an American writer of creative nonfiction and poetry. She is a professor emerita of Visual and Critical Studies at the School of the Art Institute of Chicago. 

She is a recipient of a Senior Research Residency at Asia Research Institute, National University of Singapore, a Guggenheim fellowship (in 2005), and a National Endowment for the Arts grant.
Her most recent book, Boys' Love, Cosplay, and Androgynous Idols: Queer Fan Cultures in Mainland China, Hong Kong, and Taiwan, co-edited with Ling Yang and Jing Jamie Zhao (Hong Kong University Press) was nominated for a Lambda, and an earlier book, Cut with the Kitchen Knife: The Weimar Photomontages of Hannah Höch (Yale UP) was named a New York Times Notable Book. Her other books include Clean New World (MIT Press) and Push Comes to Shove: New Images of Aggressive Women (MIT Press), as well as the anthologies The Oldest We've Ever Been (Arizona) and The Business of Holidays (Monacelli/Random House). Her essays and poems have appeared/are forthcoming in the Nation, Portable Gray, Chicago Artist Writers, Artforum, Harpy Hybrid Review, Rejection Letters, and other venues. Her work has been translated and published in Spanish, Dutch, German, Finnish, Japanese, Korean, and Chinese.

Publications 
Boys' Love, Cosplay, and Androgynous Idols: Queer Fan Cultures in Mainland China, Hong Kong, and Taiwan, co-edited with Ling Yang and Jing Jamie Zhao (Hong Kong UP, 2017)

Push Comes to Shove: New Images of Aggressive Women (MIT, 2010)
The Oldest We’ve Ever Been (Arizona, 2008), as editor and co-author
The Business of Holidays (Monacelli/Random House, 2004), as editor and co-author
Clean New World: Culture, Politics and Graphic Design (MIT, 2001)
Cut with the Kitchen Knife: The Weimar Photomontgaes of Hannah Hoech (Yale, 1993)

References 
 SAIC Faculty Page
 MIT Press Author Page
 Amazon Author Profile
 FNews Magazine Interview: Maud Lavin on Women and Aggression
 Seminary Co-op Bookstore Reading
 Lecture at the University of Chicago
 Lecture at the California College of the Arts

1954 births
Living people
21st-century American historians
Cultural historians
American women historians
School of the Art Institute of Chicago faculty
21st-century American women writers